The Raymond Theatre is located in Raymond, Washington. It was built in 1928 by Asef G. Basil with 360 seats and a Hope-Jones Wurlitzer theater organ. The Raymond Theatre is owned by the city of Raymond and is operated as a community theatre.

References

Theatres on the National Register of Historic Places in Washington (state)
Renaissance Revival architecture in Washington (state)
Theatres completed in 1928
Buildings and structures in Pacific County, Washington
Cinemas and movie theaters in Washington (state)
1928 establishments in Washington (state)
National Register of Historic Places in Pacific County, Washington